Vancouver Public Schools is a school district in Vancouver, Washington covering  in Clark County.

Schools

The district has 36 schools:

 21 elementary schools (PK-Grade 5)
 6 middle schools (Grades 6-8)
 5 high schools (Grades 9 to 12)

Vancouver High School stood for many years at the intersection of Columbia and West Fourth Plain Boulevard, but was closed in the mid-1950s, with students divided between two new schools: Fort Vancouver High School and Hudson's Bay High School.

References

External links

 Vancouver School District

Education in Clark County, Washington
School districts in Washington (state)